David Terrien (born 27 October 1976 in Nantes) is a French racing driver. He has competed in such series as International Formula 3000 and the French Formula Three Championship.

References

External links
 Career statistics from Driver Database

1976 births
Living people
Sportspeople from Nantes
French racing drivers
Formula Ford drivers
French Formula Three Championship drivers
24 Hours of Le Mans drivers
International Formula 3000 drivers
FIA GT Championship drivers
Speedcar Series drivers
24 Hours of Spa drivers

Karting World Championship drivers
Larbre Compétition drivers
Team West-Tec drivers
Durango drivers
Graff Racing drivers
DAMS drivers